Stennett is an unincorporated community in Montgomery County, Iowa, United States.

History
Stennett got its start in the year 1880 when a railroad switch was built through the territory to reach the Stennett stone quarry. Stennett's population was 28 in 1902, and 95 in 1925.

References

Unincorporated communities in Montgomery County, Iowa
Unincorporated communities in Iowa